Henicorhina is the wood wren genus; these are birds in the family Troglodytidae. It contains the following species:

 Bar-winged wood wren, Henicorhina leucoptera
 Grey-breasted wood wren, Henicorhina leucophrys
 Hermit wood wren, Henicorhina anachoreta
 White-breasted wood wren, Henicorhina leucosticta
 Munchique wood wren, Henicorhina negreti

These species live in South and Central America.

References

 
Taxa named by Philip Sclater
Taxa named by Osbert Salvin
Taxonomy articles created by Polbot